Calvisia Domitia Lucilla (also known as Domitia Lucilla Minor and Domitia Calvilla, died 155–161), was a noble Roman woman who lived in the 2nd century. She is best known as the mother of the Roman Emperor Marcus Aurelius.

Descent
Lucilla was the daughter of Domitia Lucilla Maior (Maior is Latin for the Elder) and the patrician Publius Calvisius Tullus Ruso. Her biological maternal grandfather was Gnaeus Domitius Lucanus, adoptive maternal grandfather was Gnaeus Domitius Tullus and maternal step-grandfather was Lucius Catilius Severus. Lucilla's father served as consul in 109 and the date of his second consulship is unknown.

Lucilla through her mother had inherited a great fortune, which included a tile and brick factory near Rome, close to the river Tiber. The factory provided bricks to some of Rome's most famous monuments including the Colosseum, Pantheon and the Market of Trajan, and exported bricks to France, Spain, North Africa and all over the Mediterranean. The factory, or part of it, has been excavated at Bomarzo, 40 miles north of Rome.

Marriage

Lucilla married Marcus Annius Verus, a praetor, who came from a wealthy senatorial family. Verus' sister Faustina the Elder was a Roman Empress and married the Roman Emperor Antoninus Pius. Verus was a nephew to Roman Empress Vibia Sabina and his maternal grandmother was Salonia Matidia (niece of Roman Emperor Trajan). With Verus, she had two children, a son, the future Roman Emperor Marcus Aurelius (26 April 121) and a daughter Annia Cornificia Faustina (122/123 – between 152 and 158).

Widowhood
In 124, her husband died. Her children were raised by herself and they were adopted by her father-in-law. Marcus Aurelius would later inherit the tile and brick factory.

In Lucilla's household, the future Roman Emperor Didius Julianus was educated and through her support he was able to start his legal career. Lucilla was a lady of considerable wealth and influence. In his Meditations, Marcus Aurelius describes her as a 'pious and generous' person who lived a simple life (1.3n). She spent her final years living with her son in Rome.

See also
 Calvisia gens

References

External links

 Roman Coinage of Domitia Lucilla
 Marble portraits of Domitia Lucilla, under the heading for Marcus Aurelius

Nerva–Antonine dynasty
2nd-century Roman women
2nd-century deaths
Year of birth unknown
Year of death uncertain
Ancient businesswomen
Calvisii
Ancient Roman businesspeople